William Carlton Mobley (December 7, 1906 – October 14, 1981) was a noted jurist and politician from the American state of Georgia. He is one of the ten youngest people to ever be elected to the United States House of Representatives, at the age of 25.

Early years and education
Mobley was born near Hillsboro, Jones County, Georgia; attended the common schools; and graduated from Mercer University with a law degree in 1928. While at Mercer, he was a member of Sigma Pi Fraternity.

Political service and law career
Mobley practiced law in Forsyth, Georgia before serving as secretary to Congressman Samuel Rutherford from 1929 to 1932. In 1932, Mobley was elected as a Democrat to the United States House of Representatives representing Georgia's 6th congressional district (Rutherford had died in office; Mobley was elected in a special election to replace him). Mobley did not seek reelection. Subsequently, Mobley served in Georgia's Executive Department from 1934 to 1937, under Governor Eugene Talmadge; as an Assistant Attorney General of Georgia from 1941 to 1943; as a Lieutenant Commander in the United States Navy from 1943 to 1946; and as a justice of the Supreme Court of Georgia from 1954 to 1974, including a term as chief justice from 1972 to 1974.

Later years
Following retirement from the Court, he resided in Atlanta, Georgia until his death on October 14, 1981.  He is interred in Forsyth, Georgia.

References

External links

Photo - Youngest Congressman presents credentials to Speaker Garner

1906 births
1981 deaths
Georgia (U.S. state) lawyers
United States Navy officers
Mercer University alumni
Chief Justices of the Supreme Court of Georgia (U.S. state)
Democratic Party members of the United States House of Representatives from Georgia (U.S. state)
People from Jones County, Georgia
People from Forsyth, Georgia
20th-century American lawyers
20th-century American politicians
20th-century American judges
United States Navy personnel of World War II
Justices of the Supreme Court of Georgia (U.S. state)